The following is a list of Nippon Professional Baseball players with the last name starting with F, retired or active.

F

References

External links
Japanese Baseball

 F